Tsewang Dhondup (born 1977) is politician from Tawang in the Tawang district of Arunachal Pradesh. He belongs to Indian National Congress Party and is a member of Arunachal Pradesh Legislative Assembly since 2014.

References

Living people
1941 births
People from Tawang district
Indian National Congress politicians
State cabinet ministers of Arunachal Pradesh
Arunachal Pradesh MLAs 2004–2009
Arunachal Pradesh MLAs 2009–2014